The 1935 Tschammerpokal was the 1st season of the annual German football cup competition. This was the first time a national cup tournament was held in Germany. Its name was chosen in honour of Reichssportführer Hans von Tschammer und Osten, then the highest ranking sports official in Nazi Germany. The tournament began on 6 January 1935 and ended on 8 December 1935. About 4,100 teams competed in the qualifying tournament which was divided into four stages. 63 teams competed in the final stage of six rounds. In the final 1. FC Nürnberg defeated Schalke 04 2–0.

Matches

First round

Replay

Second round

Round of 16

Quarter-finals

Semi-finals

Final

References

External links
 Official site of the DFB 
 Kicker.de 
 Tschammerpokal at Fussballberichte.de 

1935
1935 in German football cups